General Daly may refer to:

Edward M. Daly (born 1965), U.S. Army four-star general
Henry Daly (1823–1895), British Indian Army general
Paddy Daly (1888–1957), Irish National Army major general
Thomas Daly (general) (1913–2004), Australian Army lieutenant general

See also
Dell L. Dailey (born 1949), U.S. Army lieutenant general
John R. Dailey (born 1934), U.S. Marine Corps four-star general
General Daily, Malayalam newspaper
James P. Daley (fl. 1960s–2000s), U.S. National Guard brigadier general